Struggle of the Two Natures in Man is an 1888 marble sculpture by American artist George Grey Barnard. It was carved during 1892–1894 and measures  x  x . The sculpture is part of the collection of the Metropolitan Museum of Art, in New York.

References

External links
 

1888 sculptures
Marble sculptures in New York City
Nude sculptures in New York (state)
Sculptures by George Grey Barnard
Sculptures of the Metropolitan Museum of Art
Sculptures of men in New York City
Statues in New York City